Eupithecia sperryi is a moth in the family Geometridae. It is found in the US state of New Mexico and the White Mountain region of Arizona.

The wingspan is about 14 mm. The ground color of the forewings is pale, with a large discal dot and brownish costal patches as well as terminal dark shading.

References

Moths described in 1939
sperryi
Moths of North America